International STAND UP to Bullying Day is a special semi-annual event in which participants sign and wear a pink "pledge shirt" to take a visible, public stance against bullying. The event takes place in schools, workplaces, and organizations in 25 countries around the globe on the third Friday of November to coincide with Anti-Bullying Week, and then again on the last Friday of February.

History 
The first International STAND UP to Bullying Day took place in February 2008. 236 schools, workplaces and organizations representing more than 125,000 students and staff registered to take a STAND against bullying by signing and wearing a special pink pledge shirt.

Host 
Each participating school, workplace or organization hosts their own STAND with aid being provided by event coordinators Bully Help Initiatives, a Canada-based organization committed to developing effective support structures for victims of bullying through a variety of initiatives.

Pink Shirts 
Participation in the STAND constitutes the signing and wearing of a special pink pledge shirt. Signing and wearing this shirt identifies a peer based support structure to victims and their bullies in a non-confrontational way. The color of the shirts is based on a campaign started by Travis Price and David Shepherd, two students who took a stand for a fellow student who was bullied for wearing a pink shirt to school.

References

External links
 Event Photos

February observances
November observances
Friday observances
Anti-bullying campaigns
Semiannual events
Holidays and observances by scheduling (nth weekday of the month)